Roozbeh Farahanipour (Persian:روزبه فراهانی پور; born July 16, 1971 in Tehran, Iran) is an Iranian-American former student activist and a leader in the movement for an Iranian cultural renaissance and the chairman of the Marz-e Por Gohar ("Glorious Frontiers") resistance movement, which advocates the overthrow of Iran's Islamic government and its replacement with a secular Iranian Republic. After being imprisoned and tortured for his key role in the uprising of July 1999, Farahanipour went into exile in the United States where he received political asylum.

Early life
Farahanipour was born on July 16, 1971 at Tehran, Iran. He was the first child of Frank Farahanipour and Parvaneh Nasiri.

Farahanipour was a law student of at the University of Azad Tehran branch until 1993, when he was expelled on political grounds and banned from further education. In 1994 he founded a journal dedicated to Iranian Studies with an emphasis on Zoroastrianism entitled Vohuman. On July 8, 1998, together with his nationalist peers, some of whom had been involved with the Iranian Studies circle of Vohuman, Farahanipour organized the Hezbé Marzé Por Gohar ("Glorious Frontiers Party") named after the patriotic song suppressed by the Islamic regime. The Ministry of Intelligence declared Marzé Por Gohar an illegal party and denounced Farahanipour as a leader of the unrest. On July 14, 1999 his house was raided by armed Islamic militias. He was arrested together with twelve comrades and two Afghan house guests. During the course of 36 days in solitary confinement in the worst of the Islamic regime's prisons, the Towhid installation, Farahnipour was repeatedly tortured and interrogated by the Ministry of Intelligence and the revolutionary court. His personal testimony of torture was included in the United Nations' Report of the High Commissioner for Human Rights and Follow-up to the World Conference on Human Rights. He was eventually released on 50,000,000 Rials bail, which was paid with the deed to a compatriot's house.

Personal life 
Farahanipour is married to Rana Pourarab Farahanipour. Roozbeh and Rana have one child Damavand Farahanipour.

Career 
In 2009, after relocating to the United States Roozbeh founded Ruzbehjon Inc, a restaurant management & consulting firm based in Los Angeles. He is the owner of Delphi Greek Restaurant. Farahanipour also owns the Persian Gulf Bakery, cafe and Wine bar. He is also the owner of the Mary and Robbs Westwood Cafe.

In March 2014, he was appointed President of the West LA Chamber of Commerce. Farahanipour has served as a member of the following organizations; Westwood Village Rotary club, Westwood community council and California Restaurant Association. He also serves as a member of the board of BIZFED.

Life in the United States
In view of the extremely long prison sentences being received by other activists and the potential of execution, rather than waiting for the court to decide his fate Farahanipour chose to continue his struggle from abroad. He escaped Iran and sought political asylum in the United States. Now based in the Iranian expatriate community of Los Angeles, often referred to as Tehrangeles or Irangeles, Farahanipour continues his activism. He has owned Delphi Greek since 2009. Roozbeh Farahanipour was elected as a representative of the Business group to the then newly formed Westwood Neighborhood Council following elections held on June 26th 2010 with unprecedented massive participation of Westwood residents, business owners, students and UCLA faculty, employees, and those dependent on or using the services of the Westwood Community. He serves as a member of the West Los Angeles Chamber of Commerce, and is a member of the Westwood Village Rotary Club.

Books 

 Who is The Dictator

Awards and recognition 
Farahanipour was awarded with the 2014 and 2015 California Hero Honoree award consecutively. He was also given the special congressional recognition on his installation as the President of the West L.A Chamber of Commerce. His story was recorded into the American Folklife Center at the Library of Congress which is also part of the StoryCorps.

See also
 Human rights in Islamic Republic of Iran

References

External links
 Roozbeh Farahanipour
 Profile at West Los Angeles Chamber of Commerce
 BNI
 Roozbeh Farahanipour at National Review
 Westhood Neighborhood Council
 tag - Roozbeh Farahanipour at EEWorld News 

1971 births
Living people
Iranian writers
Iranian activists
Iranian politicians
Iranian journalists
Iranian expatriates in the United States